Schenkeldijk is a hamlet in the Dutch province of South Holland. It is a part of the municipality of Hoeksche Waard, and lies about 11 km south of Spijkenisse.

Schenkeldijk is not a statistical entity, and considered part of Zuid-Beijerland. It has no place name signs, and consists of about 40 houses.

References

Populated places in South Holland
Hoeksche Waard